Murmuri (also Romanized as Mūrmūrī) is a city in and capital of Kalat District, in Abdanan County, Ilam Province, Iran. At the 2006 census, its population was 3,491, in 684 families.

Murmuri is populated by Lurs.

References

Populated places in Abdanan County

Cities in Ilam Province
Luri settlements in Ilam Province